Giovanni Ventura Borghese (died 1708) was an Italian painter of the Baroque period. He was born in Città di Castello, and a pupil of Pietro da Cortona. He assisted Cortona in Rome, and completed some of his paintings after Cortona's death. He painted an Annunciation and a Virgin Mary crowned by Angels for the church of San Niccoló da Tolentino in Rome. He also painted scenes from the life of St. Catherine for the church of Città di Castello.

References

1708 deaths
17th-century Italian painters
Italian male painters
18th-century Italian painters
Italian Baroque painters
Year of birth unknown
Painters from Rome
18th-century Italian male artists